Leipzig Airport may refer to one of the two airports in Leipzig, in Germany:

Leipzig–Altenburg Airport, a small regional airport with no scheduled services
Leipzig/Halle Airport, the international airport of the area